Rosera was a Lok Sabha constituency in Bihar, India. Rosera is near Samastipur.

Assembly segments
No. 16 Rosera (रोसड़ा / रोसरा) Parliamentary Constituency was composed of the following assembly segments in 2004:
Ghanshyampur
Baheri
Warisnagar
Rosera
Singhia
Hasanpur

Members of Parliament
1952: Rameshwar Sahu, Indian National Congress
1962: Rameshwar Sahu, Indian National Congress
1967: Kedar Paswan, Samyukta Socialist Party
1971: Ram Bhagat Paswan, Indian National Congress
1977: Ram Sewak Hazary, Janata Party
1980: Baleshwar Ram, Indian National Congress
1984: Ram Bhagat Paswan, Indian National Congress
1989: Dasai Chowdhary, Janata Dal
1991: Ram Vilas Paswan, Janata Dal
1996: Pitambar Paswan, Rashtriya Janata Dal
1998: Pitambar Paswan, Rashtriya Janata Dal
1999: Ram Chandra Paswan, Janata Dal (United)
2004: Ram Chandra Paswan, Lok Janshakti Party
2008 Onwards:Does not exist.  See : Samastipur (Lok Sabha constituency)

References

Former Lok Sabha constituencies of Bihar
Former constituencies of the Lok Sabha
2008 disestablishments in India
Constituencies disestablished in 2008